The Gardens of Murcia (French: Aux jardins de Murcie) is a 1923 French silent film directed by René Hervil and Louis Mercanton and starring Arlette Marchal, Pierre Daltour and Pierre Blanchar. It was remade in 1936.

Cast
 Arlette Marchal as Maria del Carmen  
 Pierre Daltour as Pancho  
 Pierre Blanchar as Xavier  
 Max Maxudian as Domingo  
 Ginette Maddie as Fuensantieu  
 Pâquerette as Conception  
 Louis Monfils as Ardon 
 Jeanne Bérangère as Vieille femme  
 Francis Simonin

References

Bibliography 
 Ian Aitken. Realist Film Theory and Cinema: The Nineteenth-Century Lukácsian and Intuitionist Realist Traditions. Manchester University Press, 2006.

External links 
 

1923 films
French silent feature films
1920s French-language films
Films directed by Louis Mercanton
Films directed by René Hervil
Films set in Spain
French black-and-white films
1920s French films